India and the Philippines have historic ties going back over 3000 years and there are over 150,000 people of Indian origin in Philippines.

Iron Age finds in the Philippines also point to the existence of trade between Tamil Nadu in South India and the Philippine islands during the ninth and tenth centuries B.C. The influence of the culture of India on the culture of the Philippines intensified from the 2nd through the late 14th centuries CE.

The Indian-Filipinos are Philippine citizens of Indian descent. The NRI are Indian citizens living in Philippines.

This is an alphabetical list:

History

Indianisation concepts

 Indianisation
  Greater India
 Mandala (political model) 
 Indosphere
 Sanskritisation
 Early industries in Philippines that were introduced from India include boatbuilding, metal works, weaving of cotton clothes and quicklime mining method
 Flowers and their Sanskrit names introduced to Philippines by the Indian traders during the ancient times include sampaguita and champaka
 Fruits and their Sanskrit names introduced to Philippines by the Indian traders during the ancient times include mango, nangka (Jackfruit) and sirisa 
 Vegetables and their Sanskrit names introduced to Philippines by the Indian traders during the ancient times include ampalaya, patola and malunggay

Indianised kingdoms of early Philippines history 
 Maritime Southeast Asia
 History of Indian influence on Southeast Asia
 Indian influences in early Philippine polities 
 Indianised kingdoms of Philippines
 Super kingdoms spanning several present day nations
 Srivijaya empire: a Hindu-Buddhist kingdom also included Luzon and Visayas, rival of Mataram who also ruled Mindanao
 Kingdom of Mataram: a Hindu kingdom rival of Buddhist Srivijara, its king was Balitung mentioned in the Balitung inscription, spread across Java in southern Indonesia and Sulu/Mindanao in southern Philippines
 Luzon 
 Around Manila and Pasig river were 3 polities which were earlier Hindu-Buddhist, later Islamic and then subsumed and converted to Catholicism by Spanish in 16th century
 Namayan polity was confederation of barangays
 Maynila (historical entity)
 Rajah Sulayman (also Sulayman III, 1558–1575), Indianized Kingdom of Maynila
 Rajah Matanda (1480–1572), ruler of the Indianized Kingdom of Maynila, together with Rajah Sulayman was co-ruled Maynila, their cousin Lakan Dula ruled Tondo. Rajah Sulayman was one of three kings that ruled parts of present-day Manila, and fought against the Spanish Empire's colonisation of the Philippines
 Tondo (Historical State) on Pasig river near Manila
 Lakan Dula, was a raja who was cousin of Rajah Sulayman and Rajah Matanda
 Laguna Copperplate Inscription, earliest known written document found in the Philippines, in Indianized Kawi script with Sanskrit loanwords 
 Ma-i Buddhist kingdom of Mindoro island, from before 10th century till 14th century
 1406–1576 Caboloan, was a sovereign pre-colonial Philippine polity located in the fertile Agno River basin and delta, with Binalatongan as the capital. The polity of Pangasinan sent emissaries to China in 1406–1411.
 Visayas
 Rajahnate of Cebu at Singhapala (Mabolo in Cebu city on Mahinga creek) capital city in southern Cebu island was Hindu-kingdom founded by Sri Lumay or Rajamuda Lumaya, a minor prince of the Chola dynasty of India which occupied Sumatra. He was sent by the Maharajah from India to establish a base for expeditionary forces, but he rebelled and established his own independent rajahnate. Subsumed by Spanish in 16th century.
 King Sri Lumay was half Tamil and half Malay, noted for his strict policies in defending against Moro Muslim raiders and slavers from Mindanao. His use of scorched earth tactics to repel invaders gave rise to the name Kang Sri Lumayng Sugbu (literally "that of Sri Lumay's great fire") to the town, which was later shortened to Sugbu ("scorched earth").    
 Sri Bantug, king and successor son of Sri Lumay 
 Rajah Humabon, king and successor son of Sri Batung
 Battle of Mactan on 27 April 1521 between Rajah Humabon and Ferdinand Magellan in which Lapulapu fought on side of Rajah, resulting in the death of Ferdinand Magellan. 
 Lapulapu, warrior under Rajah Humabon, Lapulapu fought Spanish
 Ferdinand Magellan, Portuguese explorer on hired by Spanish empire 
 Rajah Tupas (Sri Tupas), nephew and successor of Rajah Humabon, last to rule the kingdom before subsumed by Spanish Miguel López de Legazpi in the battle of Cebu during 1565.
 Caste system: Below the rulers were the Timawa, the feudal warrior class of the ancient Visayan societies of the Philippines who were regarded as higher than the uripon (commoners, serfs, and slaves) but below the Tumao (royal nobility) in the Visayan social hierarchy. They were roughly similar to the Tagalog maharlika caste. Lapu Lapu was a Timawa.  
 A crude Buddhist medallion and a copper statue of a Hindu Deity, Ganesha, has been found by Henry Otley Beyer in 1921 in ancient sites in Puerto Princesa, Palawan and in Mactan, Cebu. The crudeness of the artifacts indicates they are of local reproduction. Unfortunately, these icons were destroyed during World War II. However, black and white photographs of these icons survive.
 Kedatuan of Madja-as of Panay island was a supra-baranganic polity from 14th century till 16th century until subsumed by Spanish, were migrants from North Sumatra in Indonesia where they were rulers of Buddhist Srivihayan "kingdom of Pannai" (ruled 10 to 14th century) which was defeated by Majapahit.  
 Mindanao
 Kingdom of Butuan in northeast Mindanao, Hindu kingdom existed earlier than 10th century and ruled till being subsumed by Spanish in 16th century
 Golden Tara (Agusan image) is a golden statue that was found in Agusan del Sur in north east Mindanao.
 Mount Diwata: named after diwata concept of Philippines based on the devata deity concept of Hinduism  
 Sultanate of Lanao of Muslims in Maguindanao in northwestern Mindanao from 15th century till present day
 Sultanate of Maguindanao in Cotabato in far west Mindanao from split from Srivijaya Hindu ancestors in 16th century and ruled till early 20th century, originally converted by sultan of Johor in 16th century but maintained informal kinship with Hindu siblings who are now likely Christians   
 Sultanate of Sulu in southwestern Mindanao, established in 1405 by a Johore-born Muslim explorer, gained independence from the Bruneian Empire in 1578 and lasted till 1986. It also covered the area in northeastern side of Borneo, stretching from Marudu Bay to Tepian Durian in present-day Kalimantan.
 Lupah Su sultanate, predecessor Islamic state before the establishment of Sultanate of Sulu.
 Maimbung principality: Hindu polity, predecessor of Lupah Su]] Muslim sultanate. Sulu that time was called Lupah Sug The Principality of Maimbung, populated by Buranun people (or Budanon, literally means "mountain-dwellers"), was first ruled by a certain rajah who assumed the title Rajah Sipad the Older. According to Majul, the origins of the title rajah sipad originated from the Hindu sri pada, which symbolises authority. The Principality was instituted and governed using the system of rajahs. Sipad the Older was succeeded by Sipad the Younger.

Indians in Philippines during colonial era 
 1762–1764 British Manila
 Battle of Manila (1762) by the East India Company's Indian soldiers during Anglo-Spanish War (1761–63)
 Cainta in Rizal: historic colonial era settlement of escaped Indians sepoys of British East India Company
 Indian Filipino: Filipino citizens with part or whole Indian blood

Key Indianised Hindu-Buddhist artifacts found in Philippines 
 Luzon 
 Laguna Copperplate Inscription in Luzon, earliest known written document found in the Philippines, in Indianized Kawi script with Sanskrit loanwords 
 Palawan Tabon Caves Garuda Gold Pendant found in the Tabon caves in the island of Palawan, is an image of Garuda, the eagle bird who is the mount of Hindu deity Vishnu
 Visayas
 Rajahnate of Cebu Buddhist medallion and copper statue of Hindu Deity: A crude Buddhist medallion and a copper statue of a Hindu Deity, Ganesha, has been found by Henry Otley Beyer in 1921 in ancient sites in Puerto Princesa, Palawan and in Mactan, Cebu. The crudeness of the artifacts indicates they are of local reproduction. Unfortunately, these icons were destroyed during World War II. However, black and white photographs of these icons survive.
 Mindanao
 Golden Tara (Agusan image) from Kingdom of Butuan in northeast Mindanao is a golden statue that was found in Agusan del Sur in north east Mindanao.

Language
 Baybayin: a Philippine script classified as an abugida, part of the Brahmic family of scripts
 Indian honorifics also influenced the Malay, Thai, Filipino and Indonesian honorifics. Examples of these include Raja, Rani, Maharlika, Datu, etc. which were transmitted from Indian culture to Philippines via Malays and Srivijaya empire
 Influence of Indian languages on Tagalog language
 Sanskrit language loanwords in Cebuano language

Sports
Filipino sports influenced by the Indian martial arts
 Filipino martial arts such as Kalis and others have been inspired by the Indian martial arts

Art, music, epics and chants
 Filipino epics and chants inspired by the Indian Hindu religious epics Ramayana and Mahabharata.
 Alim and Hudhud Oral traditions of Ifugao of Ifugao people of the Cordillera Administrative Region in Luzon island. The Hudhud – the Ifugao epic of the Ifugao was chosen as one of the 11 Masterpieces of the Oral and Intangible Heritage of Humanity in 2001 and formally inscribed as a UNESCO Intangible Cultural Heritage in 2008.
 Biag ni Lam-ang is an epic poem of the Ilocano people from the Ilocos region.
 Ibalong epic of Bikol region of southeast Luzon.
 "Aginid, Bayok sa atong Tawarik", a Bisayan epic of Cebu.
 Bayok, an epic of Marano people of northwestern Mindanao.

 Music instrument
 Kudyapi, native Filipino guitar of Maranao, Manobo and Maguindanao people, is influenced by the Indian classical music concepts of melody and scale.

Religion
 Buddhism in Southeast Asia
 Buddhism in the Philippines
 Hinduism in Southeast Asia
 Hinduism in the Philippines
 Related topics
 Religion in pre-colonial Philippines had Indianized Hindu and Buddhist influence
 Nanak Darbar Indian Sikh Temple, Iloilo

People
 List of Filipino-Indian people
 Josephine Acosta Pasricha, PhD (Indology) – Filipina Indologist
 Juan R. Francisco, PhD (Indology) – Filipino Indologist
 Filipinos in India

Business
 Business process outsourcing to India
 Business process outsourcing in the Philippines
 Indian Companies, some operate in Philippines also
 Murrah buffalo originally from the Central Institute for Research on Buffaloes, Hisar, Haryana, India was exported to Philippine Carabao Center in Nueva Ecija to improve the breed of Filipino carabao
 Maritime Southeast Asia under the influence of Indosphere

Politics and travel
 India–Philippines relations
 Visa requirements for Indian citizens
 Visa requirements for Filipino citizens
 Tourism in the Philippines
 Tourism in India

Gallery

See also

 Indian Australians
 Indian Singaporeans
 Indian Indonesians
 Indian Malaysians
 Filipino Australian
 Australian Indian Ocean Territories

References

India–Philippines relations
Indian diaspora
Hinduism in the Philippines
Philippines
India
Indosphere